Carol Anshaw (born March 22, 1946) is an American novelist and short story writer.  Publishing Triangle named her debut novel, Aquamarine, one of "The Triangle’s 100 Best" gay and lesbian novels of the 1990s. Four of her books have been finalists for the Lambda Literary Award for Lesbian Fiction, and Lucky in the Corner won the 2003 Ferro-Grumley Award.

Personal life
Carol Anshaw was born on March 22, 1946 in Grosse Pointe, Michigan. Her mother was Virginia Anshaw Stanley and her father was Henry G. Stanley. During Anshaw's childhood and adolescence, her family lived in Michigan and Florida.

Anshaw received her Bachelor of Arts degree from Michigan State University in 1968. After graduation, she moved to Chicago.

In 1969, she married Charles White. The couple eventually divorced in 1985.

She acquired her Master of Fine Arts degree at Vermont College of Fine Arts in 1992.

Since 1996 Anshaw has been partners with the documentary maker and photographer, Jessie Ewing. They were married on May 25, 2014. Now, the couple divides their time between Chicago and Amsterdam.

Career 
Anshaw has been writing fiction since 1972. Her stories have appeared in Story magazine, Tin House, The Best American Stories and Do Me: Tales of Sex and Love from Tin House.

She has published five novels. Her first, the critically acclaimed Aquamarine (1992) explores one life lived on parallel paths. 

Perhaps Anshaw's most popular novel,Carry the One (2012), has been highly regarded as a portrait of grief and American culture. The novel received warm endorsements from Emma Donoghue and Alison Bechdel. Set mainly in Chicago, Anshaw deftly takes the narrative's point of view from character to character, showing "how time affects relationships, tipping emotional dominoes one way or another within a family or circle of friends."

Her stories have been anthologized in The Best American Short Stories in 1994, 1998, and 2012.

She has won a National Book Critics Circle Citation for Excellence in Reviewing, an NEA Grant, an Illinois Arts Council Fellowship, a Carl Sandburg Award, a Ferro-Grumley Award and Society of Midland Authors Award.

Anshaw is also a painter, and is currently working on a sequence of paintings of the Channel swimmer, Gertrude Ederle. "Walking Through Leaves," her painted biography of the novelist and poet, Vita Sackville-West was up in November 2013 at Rockford University, Rockford, IL.

Awards
Publishing Triangle named Aquamarine one of "The Triangle’s 100 Best" gay and lesbian novels of the 1990s.

(1993)

Publications
 Aquamarine (1992)
 Seven Moves (1996)
 Lucky in the Corner (2002)
 Carry the One (2012)
 Right After the Weather (2019)

Anthology contributions 

 The Best American Short Stories 1994, edited by Tobias Wolff and Katrina Kenison (1994)
 The Best American Short Stories 1998, edited by Garrison Keillor and Katrina Kenison(1998)
 The Best American Short Stories 2012, edited by Tom Perrotta and Heidi Pitlor (2012)

References

External links
 Carol Anshaw's Website

21st-century American novelists
20th-century American novelists
American women novelists
American women short story writers
Living people
1946 births
American lesbian writers
American LGBT novelists
LGBT people from Michigan
People from Grosse Pointe, Michigan
20th-century American women writers
21st-century American women writers
Vermont College of Fine Arts alumni
20th-century American short story writers
21st-century American short story writers
21st-century American LGBT people
Writers from Michigan